The Sanford-Herbert Motor Truck Company (1909-1939) was a manufacturer of trucks in Syracuse, New York.

History

The Sanford-Herbert Motor Truck Company was founded in 1909 and manufactured trucks in Syracuse for over 30 years until 1939.

Advertisements

References

External links 
 Lefever Arms Collectors Association website

Defunct truck manufacturers of the United States
Defunct motor vehicle manufacturers of the United States
Motor vehicle manufacturers based in Syracuse, New York
Defunct companies based in Syracuse, New York
Vehicle manufacturing companies established in 1909
Vehicle manufacturing companies disestablished in 1939
1909 establishments in New York (state)
1939 disestablishments in New York (state)
American companies disestablished in 1939
American companies established in 1909
Defunct manufacturing companies based in New York (state)